HashiCorp is a software company with a freemium business model based in San Francisco, California. HashiCorp provides open-source tools and commercial products that enable developers, operators and security professionals to provision, secure, run and connect cloud-computing infrastructure. It was founded in 2012 by Mitchell Hashimoto and Armon Dadgar.

HashiCorp is headquartered in San Francisco, but their employees are distributed across the United States, Canada, Australia, India, and Europe.
HashiCorp offers both open-source and proprietary products.

History
On 29 November 2021, HashiCorp set terms for its IPO at 15.3 million shares at $68-$72 at a valuation of $13 billion.

HashiCorp considers their 1,500 workers to be remote workers first rather than coming into an office on a full time basis.

Open-source tools 

HashiCorp provides a suite of open-source tools intended to support the development and deployment of large-scale service-oriented software installations. Each tool is aimed at specific stages in the life cycle of a software application, with a focus on automation. Many have a plugin-oriented architecture in order to provide integration with third-party technologies and services. Additional proprietary features for some of these tools are offered commercially and are aimed at enterprise customers.

The main product line consists of the following tools:
 Vagrant (first released in 2010): supports the building and maintenance of reproducible software-development environments via virtualization technology.
  (first released in June 2013): a tool for building virtual-machine images for later deployment.
 Terraform (first released in July 2014): infrastructure as code software which enables provisioning and adapting virtual infrastructure across all major cloud providers.
 Consul (first released in April 2014): provides service mesh, DNS-based service discovery, distributed KV storage, RPC, and event propagation. The underlying event, membership, and failure-detection mechanisms are provided by Serf, an open-source library also published by HashiCorp.
 Vault (first released in April 2015): provides secrets management, identity-based access, encrypting application data and auditing of secrets for applications, systems, and users.
 Nomad (released in September 2015): supports scheduling and deployment of tasks across worker nodes in a cluster.
 Serf (first released in 2013): a decentralized cluster membership, failure detection, and orchestration software product.
 Sentinel (first released in 2017): a policy as code framework for HashiCorp products.
 Boundary (first released in October 2020): provides secure remote access to systems based on trusted identity.
 Waypoint (first released in October 2020): provides a modern workflow to build, deploy, and release across platforms.

Security issue 
Around April 2021, a supply chain attack using code auditing tool codecov allowed hackers limited access to HashiCorp's customers networks. As a result, private credentials were leaked. HashiCorp revoked a private signing key and asked its customers to use a new rotated key.

References

External links 

 
 

Software companies based in the San Francisco Bay Area
Companies based in San Francisco
Free software companies
Software companies established in 2012
Software companies of the United States
American companies established in 2012
2012 establishments in California
2021 initial public offerings
Companies listed on the Nasdaq